Jack is an unincorporated community in Coffee County, Alabama, United States. Jack has a post office with ZIP code 36346. Jack has a single K-12 school, Zion Chapel. [3] There are 1,379 residents in Jack, with a median age of 44.9. Of this, 46.56% are males and 53.44% are females. A total of 1,175 people in Jack currently live in the same house as they did last year. [4]

References
3. Zion Chapel School Website.

https://zioncoffeeal.schoolinsites.com/. Retrieved July 15, 2022. 

Unincorporated communities in Coffee County, Alabama
Unincorporated communities in Alabama

4. Demographics information, Point2 Homes. https://www.point2homes.com/US/Neighborhood/AL/Jack-Demographics.html. Retrieved July 15, 2022.